

1998

See also 
 1998 in Australia
 1998 in Australian television
List of 1998 box office number-one films in Australia

External links 
 Australian film at the Internet Movie Database

1998
Lists of 1998 films by country or language
Films